Cheikh-Alan Diarra (born 23 June 1993) is a French professional footballer who plays as a left winger.

Career 
From February 2022 he is a player of Alès(France).

References

1993 births
Living people
Footballers from Lyon
French footballers
FC Petrolul Ploiești players
ASC Oțelul Galați players
FC Dinamo-Auto Tiraspol players
FC Dacia Chișinău players
MFK Zemplín Michalovce players
Liga II players
Moldovan Super Liga players
Slovak Super Liga players
French expatriate footballers
Expatriate footballers in Romania
Expatriate footballers in Moldova
Expatriate footballers in Slovakia
French expatriate sportspeople in Romania
French expatriate sportspeople in Moldova
French expatriate sportspeople in Slovakia
Association football wingers
Ain Sud players